Schwarzach is a municipality in the Austrian state of Vorarlberg.

Population

References

External links
http://www.schwarzach.at

Cities and towns in Bregenz District